Cyclopentasilane is a cyclic compound of silicon and hydrogen. Containing five silicon atoms arranged in a ring, it is the silicon analog of cyclopentane. Cyclopentasilane is a liquid oligosilane. It is of research interest because of its potential use as a liquid silicon ink for printing silicon structures on integrated circuits or solar cells.

Production
Cyclopentasilane can be made from diphenyldichlorosilane (C6H5)2SiCl2 reacting with lithium. This forms decaphenylcyclopentasilane. This reacts with aluminium chloride in benzene catalysed with hydrogen chloride to yield decachlorocyclopentasilane. Decachlorocyclopentasilane then has its chlorine replaced by hydrogen using lithium aluminium hydride.

Properties
Cyclopentasilane is pyrophoric. It has a σ-delocalization property. Cyclopentasilane is a liquid at standard conditions, but can be frozen to crystals at 173K. The monoclinic crystals are not isomorphic to cyclopentane. The silicon to silicon bond lengths in the solid vary from 2.3353 and 2.3377 Å, which is shorter than in the substituted cyclopentasilanes or linear silanes. In gas form, those bond lengths, as measured by electron diffraction, increased to 2.342 Å.

Cyclopentasilane is sensitive, and starts decomposing when heated over 84°C, when it loses hydrogen and polymerizes. As it is heated more silane is produced, and at 178°C it yields disilane.
When heated to over 250°C it decomposes to a silicon hydrogen polymer.

Molecule shape
A five member ring can adopt a number of shapes: planar with all the atoms arranged in a pentagon with symmetry D5h; envelope symmetry Cs, with four atoms in a rectangular plane and one popped up like the flap, and twist with symmetry C2. The planar form has slightly higher energy than the other forms.

References

Silanes
Five-membered rings